Ciconio is a comune (municipality) in the Metropolitan City of Turin in the Italian region Piedmont, about  north of Turin.

Ciconio borders the following municipalities: San Giorgio Canavese, Ozegna, Rivarolo Canavese, and Lusigliè.

References

Cities and towns in Piedmont